Cherrun (also Romanized as Cherrūn and Cherūn; also known as Cherūm, Chorom, Churum, and Tchouran) is a village in Khesht Rural District, Khesht District, Kazerun County, Fars Province, Iran. At the 2006 census, its population was 64, in 11 families.

References 

Populated places in Kazerun County